Pudupattinam is a village in the Pattukkottai taluk of Thanjavur district in the Indian state of  Tamil Nadu.

Geography 
Pudupattinam is located 50 km from the district capital Thanjavur, 19 km from Pattukkottai and 328 km away from the state capital, Chennai. It covers an area of 1.39 km2.

Demographics 

According to the 2011 population census, the village has a population of 2,109 It includes 425 households . It has a literacy rate of 86.5% (91% among males and 82% among females), which is higher than the average literacy rate of Tamil Nadu (80%) . The population density is 579 per km2.

References 

 

Villages in Thanjavur district